Muschampia orientalis, the Oriental skipper, or Oriental marbled skipper, is a butterfly of the  family Hesperiidae. It is found in Montenegro, Albania, North Macedonia, Romania, Bulgaria and Greece, east to Asia Minor, northern Iran, Ukraine, the Caucasus to Kazakhstan and Turkmenistan. There is a disjoint population in northern Hungary. In the south it is also found in Wadi Al Hisha (Jordan) and Israel.

The length of the forewings is 14–15 mm. Adults are on wing from April to August in two generations.

Subspecies
There are at least three subspecies:
 Muschampia orientalis orientalis
 Muschampia orientalis maccabaeus Hemming, 1925 (Jordan, Israel)
 Muschampia orientalis teberdinus Devyatkin, 1990 (southern Russia)

This species was formerly a member of the genus Carcharodus. As a result of genomic research published in 2020, it was transferred to the genus Muschampia along with five other species.

References

External links
All Butterflies of Europe
Butterfly Conservation Armenia

Carcharodus
Butterflies of Asia
Butterflies of Europe
Butterflies described in 1913